Eduardo Couto (born 18 March 1985) is a Brazilian former sailor, who specialized in the Laser Radial and Finn classes. He won a gold medal in the Laser Radial boat at the class-associated 2005 Worlds in Fortaleza, before switching to a heavyweight division on his only Olympic trip to Beijing 2008. Couto is a member of the Rio de Janeiro Yacht Club.

Couto competed for the Brazilian sailing squad in the Finn class at the 2008 Summer Olympics in Beijing. Nearly six months earlier, he was selected over the teenager Jorge Zarif to lock the country's top Finn berth for the Games, based on his aggregate scores in a lineup of international regattas approved by the Brazilian Sailing Confederation. Couto enjoyed the series comfortably with a blistering runner-up finish and a couple of top ten marks attained in the initial half (first to fifth legs). A false-start penalty in the eighth race and an unforeseen cancellation due to lack of wind, however, faded Couto's chances to enter the final round, landing him to thirteenth overall with 89 net points.

References

External links
 
 
 
 
 Eduardo Couto at UOL Esporte 

1985 births
Living people
Brazilian male sailors (sport)
Olympic sailors of Brazil
Sailors at the 2008 Summer Olympics – Finn
Sportspeople from Rio de Janeiro (city)